The Witan was the king's council in Anglo-Saxon England from before the seventh century until the 11th century. It was composed of the leading magnates, both ecclesiastic and secular, and meetings of the council were sometimes called the Witenagemot. Its primary function was to advise the king on subjects such as promulgation of laws, judicial judgments, approval of charters transferring land, settlement of disputes, election of archbishops and bishops and other matters of major national importance. The witan also had to elect and approve the appointment of a new king. Its membership was composed of the most important noblemen, including ealdormen, thegns, and senior clergy.

Terminology
John Maddicott regarded the word  with suspicion, even though it is used in sources such as the Anglo-Saxon Chronicle:

For these reasons, in his study of the origins of the English parliament, he generally preferred the more neutral word 'assembly'. He described  as a rare 11th century usage, with only nine pre-Conquest examples, mainly in the crisis of 1051–52. Patrick Wormald was also sceptical, describing  as "a word always rare and unattested before 1035".

Henrietta Leyser commented in 2017 that for decades historians avoided using the word  for assemblies in case they were interpreted as proto-parliaments, and she went on: "Recent historiography, however, has reintroduced the term since it is clear that it was generally accepted that certain kinds of business could only be transacted with a substantial number of the king's wise men, in other words, in the company of his '. She does not mention the term .

A contemporary account of a dispute over an estate in Middlesex in the 950s refers to a decision of the Myrcna witan (Mercian witan).

Origin
It is generally accepted that the English witenagemot had its origins in ancient Germanic assemblies summoned to witness royal grants of land. Yet whatever their status in the fourth and fifth centuries, the nature of these assemblies in England was irrevocably changed when Christianity was introduced, circa A.D. 600. Hereafter, church and state were "inseparably intertwined," and this was reflected in the strong ecclesiastical element in the witan's membership and concerns; records of decisions made by witan encompass ecclesiastical and secular jurisdictions alike.

Constitution and limitations
Anglo-Saxon society was based on reciprocal arrangements between the king and all those lower in the societal order. The principal conflicts of this period, such as the Norse invasions and the Norman Conquest, all relied on troops raised by kings from ealdormen and thegns from whom they had received sworn fealty. As in later medieval times, kings offered land in this era in exchange for military support in times of war, and thus holding regular royal councils was means of ensuring nobles held input and viewpoints into defence needs, and legislative planning and feasibility when demanded. The Chronicles state that various kings of the period, during the Heptarchy and the later united England, consulted their nobles and senior clergy to witness charters and collectively form laws for the common good. This is most noted, perhaps, by the Chronicles concerning Offa of Mercia and Alfred the Great of Wessex respectively, and Æthelstan, Eadred, Edgar the Peaceful, Æthelred the Unready, and Cnut the Great, of the eventual sole Kingdom of the English. The Chronicles in many instances cite numerous Witans that were held for the aforementioned purposes, and by the aforecited monarchs of the period. The purpose of the Witan, therefore, was to ensure that those who were responsible for fighting wars, and implementing laws (more so in the case of ealdormen who held administrative control over counties and major towns/cities), could not only offer input but also forestall any potential rebellion from a lack of inclusion in this process.

The exact nature of the witenagemot, however, remains "essentially vague, fluctuating, and incoherent." Nevertheless, there is much direct evidence of the witan's various activities. Knowledge about who made up the witan and who was present at their meetings is provided mainly by lists of witnesses to charters, or grants of land, which were concocted at the witenagemots. Reference to the witan's acta or official decisions are also preserved in law codes.

The first recorded act of a witenagemot was the law code issued by King Æthelberht of Kent ca. A.D. 600, the earliest document which survives in sustained Old English prose; however, the witan was certainly in existence long before this time. Altogether, about 2,000 charters and 40 law codes survive which attest to the workings of the various meetings of the witan, of which there are around 300 recorded.

These documents clearly indicate that the witan was composed of the nation's highest echelon of both ecclesiastical and secular officers. Present on the ecclesiastical side were archbishops, bishops, and abbots, and occasionally also abbesses and priests; on the secular side ealdormen (or eorls in the latter centuries) and thegns. Members of the royal family were also present, and the king presided over the entire body.

In his investigation into Anglo-Saxon institutions, H. M. Chadwick wrote: I have not thought it necessary to discuss at length the nature of the powers possessed by the council [i.e., the witenagemot], for… there can be little hope of arriving at any definite conclusions on this subject. Indeed it seems at least doubtful whether the functions of the council were ever properly defined.

Similarly, in his study of the witenagemots, Felix Liebermann stated that "its functions and power differ… considerably at various times." Still, he was able to give a relatively detailed description of its constitution:From the time of Ine the Witan was composed of the aristocratic élite created by monarchy. The king, generally indeed advised by the existing nobility, conferred prelatures and ealdormanries, with both of which a seat in the national assembly [i.e., the witenagemot] was legally or practically connected. Members of the royal family, ladies not excepted, were present at many gemots. The king alone raised a man to the position of a gesith, a thane, a provincial or local reeve, a court officer or a royal chaplain, one of which titles seems to have been the indispensable qualification for a vote… as no periodicity of the assembly was fixed, the king determined when and where it was to meet, for the most part choosing places under his immediate control; he presided, spoke first, put his questions, proposed his bills of proposed laws, and finally dismissed the witan.

The witan was noted by contemporary sources as having the singular power to ceosan to cyninge, 'to choose the king' from amongst the (extended) royal family. Nevertheless, at least until the 11th century, royal succession generally followed the "ordinary system of primogeniture." The historian Chadwick interpreted these facts as proof that the so-called election of the king by the witan merely amounted to formal recognition of the deceased king's natural successor. But Liebermann was generally less willing than Chadwick to see the witan's significance as buried under the weight of the royal prerogative:The influence of the king, or at least of kingship, on the constitution of the assembly seems, therefore, to have been immense. But on the other hand he (the king) was elected by the witan… He could not depose the prelates or ealdormen, who held their office for life, nor indeed the hereditary thanes… At any rate, the king had to get on with the highest statesmen appointed by his predecessor, though possibly disliked by him, until death made a post vacant that he could fill with a relation or a favourite, not, however, without having a certain regard to the wishes of the aristocracy.

Liebermann's more subtle position seems to be vindicated by testimony from abbot Ælfric of Eynsham, the leading homilist of the late tenth century, who wrote:No man can make himself king, but the people has the choice to choose as king whom they please; but after he is consecrated as king, he then has dominion over the people, and they cannot shake his yoke off their necks.

In addition to having a role in the 'election' of English Kings, it is often held that the witenagemots had the power to depose an unpopular king. However, there are only two occasions when this probably happened, in 757 and 774 with the depositions of kings Sigeberht of Wessex and Alhred of Northumbria respectively.

The witan's powers are illustrated by the following event. In the year 1013 King Æthelred II ( Æthelred the Unready) fled the country from Sweyn Forkbeard, who then had the witan proclaim him king. Within a few weeks, however, Sweyn died and Æthelred was called back to England by the witan. According to the Anglo-Saxon Chronicle, the witan would only receive him back under the condition that he promise to rule better than he had. Æthelred did so, and was reinstated as King of England. His nickname of the 'Unræd' or 'Unready' means ill-advised, indicating that contemporaries regarded those who sat in the witan as part responsible for the failure of his reign.

Though in general the witan were recognized as the king's closest advisors and policy-makers, various witan also operated in other capacities; there are mentions of þeodwitan, 'people's witan', Angolcynnes witan, 'England's witan', and an Anglo-Saxon and Archbishop of York, Wulfstan II, wrote that "it is incumbent on bishops, that venerable witan always travel with them, and dwell with them, at least of the priesthood; and that they may consult with them… and who may be their counsellors at every time."

Even when summoned explicitly by kings, the witenagemots did not represent the political will of all England: before the unification of England in the tenth century, separate witenagemots were convened by the Kings of Essex, Kent, Mercia, Northumbria, Sussex and Wessex. Indeed, even after Wessex became the dominant power in England, supplanting the other kingdoms, local witan continued to meet until as late as 1067. In his work on Alfred the Great, historian David Sturdy argues that the witan did not embody modern notions of a 'national institution' or a 'democratic' body: "Victorian notions of a national 'witan' are crazy dreams without foundation, myths of a 'democratic parliament' that never was".

Function and legacy
Witan would advise on the administration and organization of the kingdom, dealing with issues such as taxation, jurisprudence and both internal and external security. The witenagemot was in many ways different from the future institution of the Parliament of England; it had substantially different powers and some major limitations, such as a lack of a fixed procedure, schedule, or meeting place. The witan could seek to prevent autocracy and carry on government during interregnums, but ultimately the witenagemot answered to the king. It only assembled when he summoned it, and its assembling without his approval could be considered treason. The witenagemot was more an advisory council. In some cases, weak kings (such as Ethelred the Unready) were dependent on the witenagemot, while others used it as simply a group of advisers.

Though no set date was ever in use, witenagemots met at least once a year, and commonly more often. There was no single seat of a witenagemot, it being held where the king was, who typically had no single fixed court either. Witenagemots are known to have met in at least 116 locations, including Amesbury, Calne, Cheddar, Gloucester, London and Winchester. The meeting places were often on royal estates, but some witenagemots were convened in the open at prominent rocks, hills, meadows and famous trees.

This arrangement ended after the Norman invasion of England in 1066 when William I of England replaced the witenagemot with the curia regis, or king's court. However, in a sign of the witenagemot's enduring legacy, the curia regis continued to be dubbed a "witan" by chroniclers until as late as the 12th century.

American Revolution
The "Saxon myth" claimed that the old Saxon Witan originated in a representative assembly of English landholders. The claim was that the original assembly was then subsequently disbanded by the Norman invaders and later reappeared as the Parliament of England. This idea was held across the Thirteen Colonies in North America in the years prior to the American Revolution (1776–1783). Among the believers were Americans including Thomas Jefferson and Jonathan Mayhew.

See also

Councils of Clovesho
Elective monarchy
Kurultai
Loya Jirga, a similar concept from Afghanistan
Majlis
Panchayati Raj
Thing (assembly)

Notes

References

Bibliography 
 
 
 
 
 Hodgkin, Thomas, The History of England from the Earliest Times to the Norman Conquest (New York, 1906; repr. New York 1969)
 Hollister, C. Warren. The Making of England, 55 B.C. to 1399 (7th ed. 1995) ch 3
 
 
 
 

 
 
 Whitelock, Dorothy, Review of The Witenagemot in the Reign of Edward the Confessor by Tryggvi J. Oleson, The English Historical Review 71 (1956): 640–42.

Further reading
 

Anglo-Saxon law
Anglo-Saxon society
Historical legislatures
Succession to the British crown